Xitun District or Situn District (literally "western village") is the second-most populated district of Taichung, Taiwan. It is located on the western side of the city. Once considered part of the countryside, the district has seen rapid growth in recent years with department store and office towers in the redevelopment zone. Taichung City Hall is located in the district.

History 
The original inhabitants of the area were the Pazeh people, who inhabited the Taichung Basin. The first Han settlers arrived in 1701, led by Liao Chao Kong and Chang Da Jing. As a result, the Pazeh people were pushed out of the area, and most of them migrated to Puli, Nantou. Many of its prehistory artifacts can be found at the Huilai Monument Archaeology Park.

The district was part of Taichung provincial city before the merger with Taichung County to form Taichung special municipality on 25 December 2010.

Geography 
Xitun is located on the western side of Taichung City. It is situated within the Taichung Basin, with the western part of the district on the slopes of the Dadu Plateau. It borders Daya to the north, Shalu and Longjing to the west, Dadu and Nantun to the south, and Beitun, North, and West districts to the east.

Administrative divisions

Economy 
 Taichung Science Park
 Taichung Shuinan Economic and Trade Park

Education 
 Feng Chia University
 Overseas Chinese University
 Tunghai University
 National Wen-Hua Senior High School

Hospitals 
The Taichung Veterans General Hospital and Cheng Ching Hospital Chung Kang Branch is located in Xitun.

Transportation 
Xitun is served by the following national roads:
  National Freeway 1: Taichung and Daya Interchanges are located in the district.
  Provincial Highway 74
  Provincial Highway 1B
  Provincial Highway 12: Also known as Taiwan Boulevard; major road of Taichung running straight through Xitun.

The district is served by buses, including a bus lane along Taiwan Boulevard that was the former BRT system. The Taichung Metro Green Line, running on Wenxin Road, has 3 stations in the district.

Tourist attractions 

 Fengchia Night Market, one of the most renowned night markets in Taiwan, located adjacent to Feng Chia University
 Huilai Monument Archaeology Park, an archaeological site where Neolithic objects were uncovered
 Luce Memorial Chapel, an iconic chapel located within Tunghai University
 National Taichung Theater
 Taichung Football Field
 Taichung Metropolitan Park, a 217-acre park located on the Dadu Plateau

See also 

 Shuikutou, an early name for the western area of the district.

References

External links 

  

Districts of Taichung